Married to Order is a 1920 American film featuring Oliver Hardy. Prints of the film survive.

Cast
 Rosemary Theby as Rose
 Oliver Hardy as Her Father (as Babe Hardy)
 Charley Chase as The Suitor
 Leo White
 Bud Ross as Car Salesman (as Budd Ross)

See also
 List of American films of 1920
 Oliver Hardy filmography

References

External links

1920 films
1920 short films
American silent short films
American black-and-white films
1920 comedy films
Silent American comedy films
American comedy short films
1920s American films